Start Gniezno is a Polish motorcycle speedway team based in Gniezno who currently race in 1. Liga.

History

1958 to 1999
Speedway in Gniezno appeared during the inaugural 1948 Polish speedway season, a team called Unia Gniezno competed in the regional Third League. However, it only lasted the one season and it was not until 1956 that Start Gniezno started riding.

The team won their first honours in 1958, after winning the second division.

In 1980, the team won the bronze medal in the Team Speedway Polish Championship. Riders included Eugeniusz Błaszak, Leon Kujawski and Jan Puk.
Krzysztof Cegielski earned a silver medal in the Polish Individual Speedway Championship during the 2002 Polish speedway season.

2000 to present 
When the Ekstraliga was introduced in 2000, Gniezno were in the 1. Liga.

The club was initially part the multi-sports club with the prefix SKS, before disbanding and being reformed as TŻ (Towarzystwo Żużlowe) in 2004 as an independent club and after another bankruptcy reformed once again under the prefix GTM (Gnieźnieńskie Towarzystwo Motorowe).

The team have generally competed in the two lower divisions in recent years, winning the 2. Liga in 2005 and 2008 and 1. Liga in 2012.

Notable riders

Teams

2023 team
To be announced

Previous teams

2022 squad

  Michael Jepsen Jensen 
  Ernest Koza
  Szymon Szlauderbach 
  Oskar Fajfer
  Antonio Lindbäck
  Marcel Studzinski 
  Mikolaj Czapla 
  Jedrzej Chmura
  Zbigniew Suchecki

Honours

References

Gniezno
Gniezno
Sport in Greater Poland Voivodeship